The International Network for Strategic Initiatives in Global HIV Trials, known as INSIGHT, is a United States-based organization which promotes HIV/AIDS research internationally. It is a member of a larger HIV research consortium called HANC. The goal of INSIGHT's research is to identify best practices for managing the AIDS epidemic.

About
INSIGHT was founded in 2006 along with other HANC organizations. INSIGHT coordinates research in 100 clinical sites in 20 countries.

Insight also conducts observational studies of flu epidemics.

References

External links
 

HIV/AIDS organizations in the United States